Acrolophitini is a small tribe of grasshoppers within the subfamily Gomphocerinae from western North America. , there are two genera and six species in the tribe Acrolophitini.

Acrolophitus Thomas, 1871 (4 species)
Bootettix Bruner, 1889 (2 species)

References

Gomphocerinae
Orthoptera tribes